Abdullahi Ali Mohamed (Barleh) is a Somali politician, second president of the unrecognized Himan and Heeb until the merger with Galmudug in 2015.

On 27 February 2017, he announced that he would run for President of Galmudug in the upcoming elections. Currently, Barleh is in the United Kingdom.

References 

Year of birth missing (living people)
Living people
Presidents of Himan and Heeb